Heroes of Might and Magic III: The Restoration of Erathia (commonly referred to as Heroes of Might & Magic 3, or Heroes 3, or abbreviated HoMM 3) is a turn-based strategy game developed by Jon Van Caneghem through New World Computing originally released for Microsoft Windows by The 3DO Company in 1999. Its ports to several computer and console systems followed in 1999–2000. It is the third installment of the Heroes of Might and Magic series.

The game's story is first referenced throughout Might and Magic VI: The Mandate of Heaven and serves as a prequel to Might and Magic VII: For Blood and Honor. The player can choose to play through seven different campaigns telling the story, or play in a scenario against computer or human opponents.

Heroes III was released to universal acclaim and was praised by critics. The game received the expansion packs Heroes of Might and Magic III: Armageddon's Blade and Heroes of Might and Magic III: The Shadow of Death. Heroes Chronicles, a series of short introductory games based on the Heroes III engine, was also released. A special version of Heroes III titled Heroes III Complete, which included the original game and both expansion packs, was released in 2000.

On December 10, 2014, Ubisoft announced an HD version of the game. The new version features updated graphics as well as widescreen compatibility and was released on January 29, 2015, for Microsoft Windows, iOS and Android. The expansions have not been re-released because their source code was lost. However, in 2017, source code for the full version of the game was found, when one of the contractors responsible for porting the game to Mac found the source, tools and assets on a hard drive, and uploaded it to Ubisoft.

Gameplay

The gameplay is very similar to its predecessors in that the player controls a number of heroes that command an army of creatures inspired by myth and legend. The gameplay is divided into two parts, tactical overland exploration and a turn-based combat system. The player creates an army by spending resources at one of the eight town types in the game. The hero progresses in experience by engaging in combat with enemy heroes and monsters. The conditions for victory vary depending on the map, including conquest of all enemies and towns, collection of a certain amount of a resource, or finding the grail artifact. If a player loses all of their towns they will have seven game days to capture a new town. If they fail to do so they lose and the game ends. If a player loses all their heroes and towns, they will lose the game.

There are two "layers" to the world map: the aboveground and the underground. There are typically subterranean gateways that lead to and from the underground. Maps are filled with a huge variety of buildings, treasures, monsters, mines and so forth that reward extensive exploration. At the very least, a player must locate mines and flag them (whereupon they provide constant resources), since these resources are required to develop towns. The player must also develop their heroes' primary and secondary skills, both by battling creatures (and enemy heroes) and by acquiring artifacts or visiting special locations. Heroes are given a choice of skills to upgrade upon leveling up, as well as becoming better at combat or using magic. The skills must be chosen carefully, since they are permanent and only a limited number of skills can be learned.

The player's towns serve many functions, but most importantly they allow recruitment of creatures to form armies. Towns also provide funds, new spells and a fortified location to make a last stand against an invading enemy hero. To build new structures within a town requires gold and usually one or more type of resource. Wood and ore are needed for most structures, but more expensive buildings also require rarer resources (mercury, crystal, gems or sulfur). All factions require a disproportionate quantity of just one of these special resources, making the acquisition of a corresponding mine essential to victory. This same resource is also needed when hiring the most powerful creatures available to that faction. Each faction also has a handful of unique structures available only to them.

If a player finds the Grail artifact, they can deliver it to a town to make that town the Grail's permanent home by creating a special structure. The Grail bestows greatly increased creature growth and weekly income, in addition to a bonus unique to the town.

The eight different castles available in Heroes III are classified as good, evil, and neutral. Each town has seven basic creatures, each of which can be upgraded to a more powerful variant. Each town also features two associated hero types: one that leans more toward might (attack and defense), and one that leans more toward magic.

Plot
The game's story unfolds primarily through a series of seven playable campaigns, all set upon the continent of Antagarich. During the campaigns, the story is told from alternating points of view, giving players the opportunity to play as each of the town alignments.

Following the disappearance of King Roland Ironfist of Enroth prior to Might and Magic VI: The Mandate of Heaven, his wife, Queen Catherine, is left to rule the realm. In the meantime, her father, King Gryphonheart of Erathia, is assassinated. Without their beloved King, the kingdom of Erathia falls to the dark forces of Nighon and Eeofol. Queen Catherine returns home to Antagarich seeking to rally the people of her homeland and lead them against the evil that has ravaged their nation.

Erathia's capital of Steadwick is sacked by the dungeon lords of Nighon and the Kreegans of Eeofol. Meanwhile, the nations of Tatalia and Krewlod skirmish at the western border, seizing the chance to expand their territory. Catherine's first task is to establish a foothold in the conquered kingdom by enlisting the aid of allies. The wizards of Bracada and the elves of AvLee answer her call, and together they push towards Steadwick and eventually retake it, quickly quelling the border war in the west. Soon after, Lucifer Kreegan, a commander in the Eeofol armies, sends an envoy to Erathia claiming that Roland Ironfist is captive within their territories. AvLee invades Eeofol, but fails to rescue Roland, who is transported to their northern holdings. Afterwards, Catherine invades Nighon, pushing the dungeon armies back to their island home.

In the meantime, the necromancers of Deyja, having been responsible for the assassination of King Gryphonheart, plot to revive his corpse as a lich. They plan to use his wisdom in leading their own armies of the undead. However, King Gryphonheart's will proves too much for the necromancers even in his corrupted state, and he becomes a rogue lich. Having little other recourse, Queen Catherine is forced to ally herself with the necromancers and together they set out to destroy the lich of King Gryphonheart before he becomes too powerful.

A final bonus campaign, accessible only after the main campaigns are complete, tells the story of separatists living in the Contested Lands, a war-torn border between Erathia and AvLee. Tired of the skirmishes that bring unrest to their homelands, they join to fight for independence from the two large kingdoms. It is later implied that this rising was orchestrated by Archibald Ironfist, the antagonist of Heroes of Might and Magic II.

Release
The game was originally released for PC Windows on March 3, 1999. An Apple Macintosh port was released by 3DO, and a Linux port was released by Loki Software, both in late December that year. In 2000, a Game Boy Color port entitled Heroes of Might and Magic 2 was released. A straight Dreamcast port retaining the original title was also developed and completed, but it wasn't released due to technical issues that prevented the console running the game adequately.

Expansion packs 

Two official expansion packs were released for Heroes III. The first of these expansions, Armageddon's Blade, introduced a ninth town alignment, the Conflux; a random scenario generator, a variety of new creatures, heroes, and structures; and six new playable campaigns.

The second expansion, The Shadow of Death, was a stand-alone expansion that included Restoration of Erathia and added seven new playable campaigns and a variety of new artifacts, including Combination Artifacts. Combination Artifacts were extremely powerful items assembled by collecting a specific set of lesser artifacts.

Complete edition
In 2000, a bundle containing Heroes III and both expansion packs was released as Heroes of Might and Magic III: Complete. More than just bundling the original game discs, however, this release reworked the game's installation process as well as its in-game menus to reflect a unified product.

Heroes of Might & Magic III – HD Edition
On January 29, 2015, about 15 years after the original release of Heroes of Might & Magic III, Ubisoft released a new high-definition version of the game compatible with PCs as well as Android and iOS tablets. The expansion packs were not included because the source code for those releases was lost.

Unofficial releases
A fan-made expansion, In the Wake of Gods (also titled Heroes 3.5), was released in 2001. It adds new creatures, including eighth level creatures and "God's representatives", which give bonus to heroes' primary skills. Heroes can also destroy and rebuild towns.

Horn of the Abyss, a second fan-made expansion, was announced in 2008 and released on December 31, 2011. It adds a new town type, a large number of new items to put on maps, new playable campaigns, a graphical random map generator template editor, among other features.

VCMI is an open source implementation of the engine for Windows, Linux, macOS, Android and iOS. It offers higher resolutions and extensive mod support.

Reception

Heroes of Might and Magic III

Critical reviews

The original game received favorable reviews according to the review aggregation website GameRankings.

Computer Gaming Worlds Robert Coffey said that the game "expands upon the insanely addictive play of the previous edition, retaining the core gameplay while enhancing almost every facet of the game." He continued to say that the game is "mind-boggling in its depth", but criticized its uneven campaign pacing and "sluggish" connection speeds during online play. He concluded: "Ultimately, the rewards of Heroes of Might and Magic III far outweigh its few drawbacks. ... [This] is a game that strategy fans should absolutely be playing." Next Generation said, "While realtime strategy withers on the vine, with many recent releases lackluster at best, HoMM reminds us that turn-based play is alive and well. In fact, it's hard to remember why people said turn-based was dead in the first place."

Sales
The game entered PC Data's weekly computer game sales charts at #3 for the February 28-March 6 period. It held the position for another two weeks, before exiting the weekly top 10 in its fourth week. It was the U.S.' second-best-selling computer game of March 1999. PC Data, which tracked sales in the U.S., reported that the game had sold 185,553 units in September 2000. The combined global sales of the Heroes series had reached 1.5 million units by December 1999.

Awards
The game was a finalist for Computer Games Strategy Plus 1999 "Strategy Game of the Year" prize, although it lost to RollerCoaster Tycoon. The staff wrote that the game "keeps this series running on all cylinders. There's nothing radically different here, but what would you change?" It was also a finalist for the "PC Strategy Game of the Year" award at the Academy of Interactive Arts & Sciences' 3rd Annual Interactive Achievement Awards, which went to Age of Empires II: The Age of Kings. The game was a runner-up for "Best Music" at GameSpots Best & Worst of 1999 Awards, which went to Homeworld.

HD Edition

The PC and iOS versions of the HD Edition received "mixed or average reviews" according to the review aggregation website Metacritic.

Board game adaptation 
In 2022, Archon Games announced that they were creating a board game based on Heroes of Might and Magic III. The game involves deckbuilding, combat units, and economic management. Each play session will have a different goal, with maps generated by placing tiles in a dynamic way.

The Kickstarter campaign received more than  million in its first week, and reached 2.6 million pounds in its final week, or 6000% of its £43,000 funding goal.

References

Further reading

External links
 
 
 http://heroes.thelazy.net/ Heroes of Might and Magic Wiki
 https://h3hota.com/ Horn of the Abyss (free community made expansion for Heroes III)

1999 video games
Android (operating system) games
Cancelled Dreamcast games
Heroes of Might and Magic
IOS games
Linux games
Loki Entertainment games
Classic Mac OS games
New World Computing games
The 3DO Company games
Turn-based strategy video games
Video games developed in the United States
Video games featuring female protagonists
Video games scored by Paul Romero
Video games scored by Steve Baca
Video games with expansion packs
Video games with isometric graphics
Windows games
Multiplayer and single-player video games